The following is a list of industrial occupations. Industrial occupations are generally characterized by being manual-labour-intensive and requiring little to no education.
 Arborist
 Auto mechanic
 Beader
 Bobbin boy
 Construction worker
 Factory worker
 Feller
 Filling station attendant
 Foreman
 Maintenance engineering
 Mechanic
 Miller
 Moldmaker
 Panel beater
 Patternmaker
 Plant operator
 Plumber
 Sawfiler
 Shop foreman
 Soaper
 Stationary engineer
 Welder
 Wheelwright
 Woodworkers

References

Lists of occupations

Occupations